Georgi Hristakiev (Bulgarian: Георги Христакиев; 28 June 1944 – 4 April 2016) was a Bulgarian footballer who played as a defender. He competed at the 1968 Summer Olympics in Mexico City, where he won a silver medal with the Bulgarian team. At club level Hristakiev achieved prominence during his successful stint with Lokomotiv Sofia.

References

1944 births
2016 deaths
Bulgarian footballers
Bulgaria international footballers
Olympic footballers of Bulgaria
Footballers at the 1968 Summer Olympics
Olympic silver medalists for Bulgaria
Olympic medalists in football
First Professional Football League (Bulgaria) players
PFC Beroe Stara Zagora players
FC Spartak Plovdiv players
FC Lokomotiv 1929 Sofia players
PFC Slavia Sofia players
PFC Lokomotiv Plovdiv players
Sportspeople from Stara Zagora
Medalists at the 1968 Summer Olympics
Association football defenders